The Australian Wallabies first played against Argentina (Los Pumas) on 27 October 1979, resulting in a win to Argentina.

The teams have met thirty-four times, with Australia winning twenty-five, Argentina six and three matches drawn. Three of the matches have taken place in the Rugby World Cup; two pool matches, in 1991 and 2003, and a semi-final in 2015. Australia have won all three Rugby World Cup matches.

The Puma Trophy was established in 2000 as a perpetual trophy between the two nations.

The Wallabies are the national side which the Pumas have tied the most, with three ties in their history.

Summary

Overall

Records
Note: Date shown in brackets indicates when the record was or last set.

Results

List of series

References

External links
 Pick and Go Rugby test match database

 
Argentina national rugby union team matches
Australia national rugby union team matches
rugby union